The men's hammer throw event at the 2006 Commonwealth Games was held on March 24.

Results

References
Results

Hammer
2006